Raymond Morkel (23 August 1908 – 8 November 1953) was a South African cricketer. He played in sixteen first-class matches from 1926/27 to 1939/40.

References

External links
 

1908 births
1953 deaths
Border cricketers
Cricketers from Bellville, South Africa
Free State cricketers
South African cricketers
Western Province cricketers